Mae Fa Luang is a tambon (subdistrict) of Mae Fa Luang District, in Chiang Rai Province, Thailand. In 2020 it had a total population of 12,828 people.

History
The subdistrict was created effective November 16, 1995 by splitting off 12 administrative villages from Thoet Thai.

Administration

Central administration
The tambon is subdivided into 19 administrative villages (muban).

Local administration
The whole area of the subdistrict is covered by the subdistrict administrative organization (SAO) Mae Fa Luang (องค์การบริหารส่วนตำบลแม่ฟ้าหลวง).

References

External links
Thaitambon.com on Mae Fa Luang

Tambon of Chiang Rai province
Populated places in Chiang Rai province